Zero Fatigue is an American musical collective and independent record label with a split-base in both St. Louis, Missouri and Chicago, Illinois. The collective was founded by Smino and includes artists and producers Monte Booker, Ravyn Lenae, JayBaby TheGreaty, and Nosidam. The label is run by Chris "Classick" Innumerable.

History
The collective's origins began when Smino met Chris "Classick" Innumerable at Columbia College Chicago, who owned a recording studio in his house in Chicago and later became his manager. Interning for Classick, engineer and mixer Elton "L10MixedIt" Chueng met Smino in that studio where they began working together. In 2012, they met rappers Bari Allen and Jay2 and producer Monte Booker while making music together and formed the collective Zero Fatigue after creating a song of the same title, with lyrics "Zero Fatigue, I'm out of my league". The crew later expanded and added members Ravyn Lenae and Nosidam. Unofficial members and affiliates of Zero Fatigue include Jean Deaux, Drea Smith, and Phoelix. Zero Fatigue is a collective creating a safe space for homegrown artists to harvest their raw talent and demonstrate a futuristic funk element of rap.

Members
Current acts
 Smino
 Ravyn Lenae
 NOS.
 JayBaby TheGreaty

In-house producers
 Monte Booker
 Phoelix
 Groove
 VZN

Studio personnel
 Chris "Classick" Innumerable
 Elton "L10MixedIt" Chueng
 Jeffrey "Jeffontheboards" Thompson

Former members
 Bari
 Jay2

Discography

Studio albums

Mixtapes

Extended plays

References

American hip hop groups
American record labels
Alternative hip hop groups
Hip hop collectives
Hip hop record labels
Midwest hip hop groups
Musical groups from Chicago
Musical groups from St. Louis
Musical groups established in 2014
Record labels established in 2014
Vanity record labels
2014 establishments in the United States